Visa policy of ASEAN members may refer to:

Visa policy of Brunei
Visa policy of Cambodia
Visa policy of Indonesia
Visa policy of Laos
Visa policy of Malaysia
Visa policy of Myanmar
Visa policy of the Philippines
Visa policy of Singapore
Visa policy of Thailand
Visa policy of Vietnam

Mutual visa policy among ASEAN members

See also 
 Visa policy of East Timor

ASEAN
Foreign relations of Indonesia
ASEAN